Pachylomera is a genus of dung beetle from the family Scarabaeidae and tribe Scarabaeini, with records from Africa south of the equator.

Species and Description
BioLib lists:
 Pachylomera femoralis Kirby, 1828 - type species
 Pachylomera opaca Lansberge, 1874
P. femoralis is the largest flying, ball-rolling dung beetle in the world. The front legs are particularly strong, with the flattened leg appendages: it walks with these while rolling balls of buffalo and elephant dung.

References

External links
 
 

Scarabaeidae genera
Beetles of Africa